Parahyagnis ficivora is a species of beetle in the family Cerambycidae. It was described by Francis Polkinghorne Pascoe in 1864, originally under the genus Alphitopola. It is known from South Africa. It contains the varietas Parahyagnis ficivora var. intricata.

References

Tragocephalini
Beetles described in 1864